Andemtenga (sometimes spelt Amdemtenga, Andamtenga or Amdentenga) is the capital and largest settlement in Andemtenga Department, Kouritenga province, Burkina Faso. It had a population of about 2,120 in 2006.

On 15 January 2017, the Burkinabé musician Floby was made Noom Naaba or "Chief of the Atmosphere" of Andemtenga, his home town, by the customary canton chief.

Demographics

Neighbourhoods

References 

Populated places in the Centre-Est Region